The 2003 World Table Tennis Championships mixed doubles was the 47th edition of the mixed doubles championship.

Ma Lin and Wang Nan defeated Liu Guozheng and Bai Yang in the final by four sets to three.

Finals

References

External links
 Main draw archived from ITTF.
 Players' matches. ITTF.
 WM 2003 Paris (Frankreich). tt-wiki.info (in German).
 Top half / bottom half of main draw. sports.sina.com.cn (in Chinese).

-